Zhidoi County is a county in the west and southwest of Qinghai Province, China, bordering the autonomous regions of Tibet to the west and Xinjiang to the northwest. It is under the administration of Yushu Tibetan Autonomous Prefecture.

Administrative divisions
Zhidoi County (Zhiduo County) is divided to 1 towns and 5 townships.
Towns
 Jiajiboluoge

Townships

Climate

See also
Hoh Xil

References

County-level divisions of Qinghai
Yushu Tibetan Autonomous Prefecture